Ronald Victor Emerson  (born 22 February 1947) is a British businessman who is currently Chairman of Bank North. He was the founding Chairman of the British Business Bank from 2013 to 2016.

He was educated at West Hartlepool Grammar School, the University of Manchester (BSc Engineering), Durham University (MSc), and University of Oxford, (MLitt, MA) "Emerson, Ronald Victor, (born 22 Feb. 1947), Chairman, B North, since 2019." WHO'S WHO ref>

He was Senior Advisor to both the Bank of England and Financial Services Authority from 1997 to 2000, and Chairman of Fairfield Energy from 2010 to 2016. He is a former Chairman of Amsterdam Trade Bank.

He was made a Commander of the Order of the British Empire (CBE) in the 2017 New Year Honours for services to international banking and the financing of small and mid sized businesses.

References

1947 births
Living people
Alumni of the University of Manchester
Alumni of Templeton College, Oxford
Academics of Saïd Business School
Commanders of the Order of the British Empire
People from Hartlepool
Alumni of Durham University Graduate Society